Hikmat Kumar Karki (Nepali: हिक्मत कुमार कार्की; born 15 June 1966) is a Nepalese politician, belonging to the Communist Party of Nepal (Unified Marxist–Leninist) currently serving as the chief minister of Koshi Province.He is also member of standing committee of CPN (UML). Karki has been serving as a member of the provincial assembly of Koshi Province  from Jhapa 5 (A) since 2017. Karki had previously served as the Minister for Internal Affairs and Law in Sher Dhan Rai's cabinet from 2018 to 2021.

Electoral history

2022 provincial elections

Jhapa 5 (A)

2017 provincial elections

Jhapa 5 (A)

See also
 Communist Party of Nepal (Unified Marxist–Leninist)

References

External links

 

Members of the Provincial Assembly of Koshi Province
Chief Ministers of Nepalese provinces
1966 births
Living people